The Descendants of Cain (카인의 후예) is a novel by Hwang Sun-won (황순원).

Published in 1954 in Seoul, it was instantly popular and has continued to be a steady seller ever since. It was selected by LTI Korea for translation into English and French.

Plot 
Set in 1946, the novel's central theme is the forced collectivization of agricultural land in North Korea, a national crisis that altered the path of the history of Korea.

Film

The novel was adapted into a 1968 movie directed by Yu Hyun-mok.

References

1954 novels
20th-century South Korean novels
Novels set in North Korea
South Korean novels adapted into films